Életot is a commune in the Seine-Maritime department in the Normandy region in northern France.

Geography
A pebble beach and spectacular limestone cliffs can be reached by way of the steps of the val d’Ausson.

Heraldry

Population

Places of interest
 The church of St.Pierre, dating from the seventeenth century.

See also
Communes of the Seine-Maritime department

References

Communes of Seine-Maritime